WBVL-LP (99.7 FM) is a radio station licensed to Kissimmee, Florida, United States. The station is currently owned by Sucremedia, Inc.

References

External links
 

BVL-LP
BVL-LP